Quercus carmenensis, the Mexican oak, is a tree species native to Brewster County, Texas, and Coahuila, Mexico. It is a deciduous species with gray bark and red twigs. The leaves are lanceolate with irregular lobing along the margins.

References

External links
 isotype of  Quercus carmenensis, photo of herbarium specimen at Missouri Botanical Garden, collected in Coahuila in 1936

carmenensis
Flora of Coahuila
Flora of Texas
Plants described in 1937
Oaks of Mexico